Norwegian Floorball Eliteserie is a Floorball championships.

History
The Norwegian Eliteserie League was founded in 1994 under the name Eliteserien ("The Elite Series").

Season structure
The season starts with a regular season with 22 matches per team, one home and one away against all teams. In the spring a play-off starts with the eight best teams from the regular season. The final is played in a random arena together with the women's Eliteserien final.

Current clubs
Sarpsborg 
Greåker 
Fjerdingby
Sveiva
Slevik 
Gjelleråsen
Sagene
Nor 92
Harstad
Tunet
Kverneland
Fredrikstad
Grei SF

External links

Floorball in Norway
Sports leagues in Norway
1994 establishments in Norway
Sports leagues established in 1994